Microplastics are fragments of any type of plastic less than  in length, according to the U.S. National Oceanic and Atmospheric Administration (NOAA) and the European Chemicals Agency. They cause pollution by entering natural ecosystems from a variety of sources, including cosmetics, clothing, food packaging, and industrial processes.

The term macroplastics is used to differentiate microplastics from larger plastic waste, such as plastic bottles. Two classifications of microplastics are currently recognized. Primary microplastics include any plastic fragments or particles that are already 5.0 mm in size or less before entering the environment. These include microfibers from clothing, microbeads, and plastic pellets (also known as nurdles). Secondary microplastics arise from the degradation (breakdown) of larger plastic products through natural weathering processes after entering the environment. Such sources of secondary microplastics include water and soda bottles, fishing nets, plastic bags, microwave containers, tea bags and tire wear. Both types are recognized to persist in the environment at high levels, particularly in aquatic and marine ecosystems, where they cause water pollution. 35% of all ocean microplastics come from textiles/clothing, primarily due to the erosion of polyester, acrylic, or nylon-based clothing, often during the washing process. However, microplastics also accumulate in the air and terrestrial ecosystems.

Because plastics degrade slowly (often over hundreds to thousands of years), microplastics have a high probability of ingestion, incorporation into, and accumulation in the bodies and tissues of many organisms. The toxic chemicals that come from both the ocean and runoff can also biomagnify up the food chain. In terrestrial ecosystems, microplastics have been demonstrated to reduce the viability of soil ecosystems and reduce weight of earthworms. The cycle and movement of microplastics in the environment are not fully known, but research is currently underway to investigate the phenomenon. Deep layer ocean sediment surveys in China (2020) show the presence of plastics in deposition layers far older than the invention of plastics, leading to suspected underestimation of microplastics in surface sample ocean surveys. Microplastics have also been found in the high mountains, at great distances from their source.

Microplastics have also been found in human blood, though their effects are largely unknown.

Classification

The term "microplastics" was introduced in 2004 by Professor Richard Thompson, a marine biologist at the University of Plymouth in the United Kingdom.

Microplastics are common in our world today. In 2014, it was estimated that there are between 15 and 51 trillion individual pieces of microplastic in the world's oceans, which was estimated to weigh between 93,000 and 236,000 metric tons.

Primary microplastics

Primary microplastics are small pieces of plastic that are purposefully manufactured. They are usually used in facial cleansers and cosmetics, or in air blasting technology. In some cases, their use in medicine as vectors for drugs was reported. Microplastic "scrubbers", used in exfoliating hand cleansers and facial scrubs, have replaced traditionally used natural ingredients, including ground almond shells, oatmeal, and pumice. Primary microplastics have also been produced for use in air blasting technology. This process involves blasting acrylic, melamine, or polyester microplastic scrubbers at machinery, engines, and boat hulls to remove rust and paint. As these scrubbers are used repeatedly until they diminish in size and their cutting power is lost, they often become contaminated with heavy metals such as cadmium, chromium, and lead. Although many companies have committed to reducing the production of microbeads, there are still many bioplastic microbeads that also have a long degradation life cycle similar to normal plastic.

Secondary microplastics
Secondary plastics are small pieces of plastic derived from the breakdown of larger plastic debris, both at sea and on land. Over time, a culmination of physical, biological, and chemphotodegradation, including photo-oxidation caused by sunlight exposure, can reduce the structural integrity of plastic debris to a size that is eventually undetectable to the naked eye. This process of breaking down large plastic material into much smaller pieces is known as fragmentation. It is considered that microplastics might further degrade to be smaller in size, although the smallest microplastic reportedly detected in the oceans at present is 1.6 micrometres (6.3×10−5 in) in diameter. The prevalence of microplastics with uneven shapes suggests that fragmentation is a key source. It was observed that more microplastics might be formed from biodegradable polymer than from non-biodegradable polymer in both seawater and fresh water.

Other sources: as a by-product/dust emission during wear and tear
There are countless sources of both primary and secondary microplastics. Microplastic fibers enter the environment from the washing of synthetic clothing. Tires, composed partly of synthetic styrene-butadiene rubber, will erode into tiny plastic and rubber particles as they are used. Furthermore, 2.0-5.0 mm plastic pellets, used to create other plastic products, often enter ecosystems due to spillages and other accidents.
A Norwegian Environment Agency review report about microplastics published in early 2015 states it would be beneficial to classify these sources as primary, as long as microplastics from these sources are added from human society since the "start of the pipe", and their emissions are inherently a result of human material and product use and not secondary defragmentation in the nature.

Nanoplastics
Depending on the definition used, nanoplastics are less than 1 μm (i.e. 1000 nm) or less than 100 nm in size. Speculations over nanoplastics in the environment range from it being a temporary byproduct during the fragmentation of microplastics to it being an invisible environmental threat at potentially high and continuously rising concentrations. The presence of nanoplastics in the North Atlantic Subtropical Gyre has been confirmed and recent developments in Raman spectroscopy coupled with optical tweezers (Raman Tweezers) as well as nano-fourier-transform infrared spectroscopy (nano-FTIR) or atomic force infrared (AFM-IR) are promising answers in the near future regarding the nanoplastic quantity in the environment. Fluorescence could represent a unique tool for the identification and quantification of nanoplastics, since it allows the development of fast, easy, cheap, and sensitive methods.

Nanoplastics are thought to be a risk to environmental and human health. Due to their small size, nanoplastics can cross cellular membranes and affect the functioning of cells. Nanoplastics are lipophilic and models show that polyethylene nanoplastics can be incorporated into the hydrophobic core of lipid bilayers. Nanoplastics are also shown to cross the epithelial membrane of fish accumulating in various organs including the gallbladder, pancreas, and the brain. Little is known on adverse health effects of nanoplastics in organisms including humans. In zebrafish, polystyrene nanoplastics can induce a stress response pathway altering glucose and cortisol levels, which is potentially tied to behavioral changes in stress phases. In Daphnia, polystyrene nanoplastic can be ingested by the freshwater cladoceran Daphnia pulex and affect its growth and reproduction as well as induce stress defense, including the ROS production and MAPK-HIF-1/NF-κB-mediated antioxidant system.

Sources
Most microplastic pollution comes from textiles, tires and city dust which account for over 80% of all microplastic in the environment. The existence of microplastics in the environment is often established through aquatic studies. These include taking plankton samples, analyzing sandy and muddy sediments, observing vertebrate and invertebrate consumption, and evaluating chemical pollutant interactions. Through such methods, it has been shown that there are microplastics from multiple sources in the environment.

Microplastics could contribute up to 30% of the Great Pacific Garbage Patch polluting the world's oceans and, in many developed countries, are a bigger source of marine plastic pollution than the visible larger pieces of marine litter, according to a 2017 IUCN report.

Car and truck tires

Wear and tear from tires significantly contributes to the flow of (micro-)plastics into the environment. Secondary microplastics (e.g. from car and truck tires or footwear) are more important than primary microplastics by two orders of magnitude. The formation of microplastics from the degradation of larger plastics in the environment is not accounted for in the study.

The estimated per capita emission ranges from 0.23 to 4.7 kg/year, with a global average of 0.81 kg/year. The emissions from car tires (wear reaching 100%) are substantially higher than those of other sources of microplastics, e.g., airplane tires (2%), artificial turf (wear 12–50%), brakes (wear 8%), and road markings (wear 5%). In the case of road markings, recent field study indicated that they were protected by a layer of glass beads and their contribution was only between 0.1 and 4.3 g/person/year, which would constitute approximately 0.7% of all of the secondary microplastics emissions; this value agrees with some emissions estimates. Emissions and pathways depend on local factors like road type or sewage systems. The relative contribution of tire wear and tear to the total global amount of plastics ending up in our oceans is estimated to be 5–10%. In air, 3–7% of the particulate matter (PM2.5) is estimated to consist of tire wear and tear, indicating that it may contribute to the global health burden of air pollution which has been projected by the World Health Organization (WHO) at 3 million deaths in 2012. Pollution from tire wear and tear also enters the food chain, but further research is needed to assess human health risks.

Clothing
Studies have shown that many synthetic fibers, such as polyester, nylon, acrylics, and spandex, can be shed from clothing and persist in the environment. Each garment in a load of laundry can shed more than 1,900 fibers of microplastics, with fleeces releasing the highest percentage of fibers, over 170% more than other garments.

Washing machine manufacturers have also reviewed research into whether washing machine filters can reduce the amount of microfiber fibers that need to be treated by sewage treatment facilities.

These microfibers have been found to persist throughout the food chain from zooplankton to larger animals such as whales. The primary fiber that persist throughout the textile industry is polyester which is a cheap cotton alternative that can be easily manufactured. However, these types of fibers contribute greatly to the persistence to microplastics in terrestrial, aerial, and marine ecosystems. The process of washing clothes causes garments to lose an average of over 100 fibers per liter of water. This has been linked with health effects possibly caused by the release of monomers, dispersive dyes, mordants, and plasticizers from manufacturing. The occurrence of these types of fibers in households has been shown to represent 33% of all fibers in indoor environments.

Textile fibers have been studied in both indoor and outdoor environments to determine the average human exposure. The indoor concentration was found to be 1.0–60.0 fibers/m3, whereas the outdoor concentration was much lower at 0.3–1.5 fibers/m3. The deposition rate indoors was 1586–11,130 fibers per day/m3 which accumulates to around 190-670 fibers/mg of dust. The largest concern with these concentrations is that it increases exposure to children and the elderly, which can cause adverse health effects.

Cosmetics industry
Some companies have replaced natural exfoliating ingredients with microplastics, usually in the form of "microbeads" or "micro-exfoliates". These products are typically composed of polyethylene, a common component of plastics, but they can also be manufactured from polypropylene, polyethylene terephthalate (PET), and nylon. They are often found in face washes, hand soaps, and other personal care products; the beads are usually washed into the sewage system immediately after use. Their small size prevents them from fully being retained by preliminary treatment screens at wastewater plants, thereby allowing some to enter rivers and oceans. In fact, wastewater treatment plants only remove an average of 95–99.9% of microbeads because of their small design . This leaves an average of 0–7 microbeads per litre being discharged. Considering that the treatment plants of the world discharge 160 trillion liters of water per day, around 8 trillion microbeads are released into waterways every day. This number does not account for the sewage sludge that is reused as fertilizer after the waste water treatment that has been known to still contain these microbeads.

Although many companies have committed to phasing out the use of microbeads in their products, according to research, there are at least 80 different facial scrub products that are still being sold with microbeads as a main component. This contributes to the 80 metric tons of microbead discharge per year by the United Kingdom alone, which not only has a negative impact upon the wildlife and food chain, but also upon levels of toxicity, as microbeads have been proven to absorb dangerous chemicals such as pesticides and polycyclic aromatic hydrocarbons. The restriction proposal by the European Chemicals Agency (ECHA) and reports by the United Nations Environment Programme (UNEP) and TAUW suggest that there are more than 500 microplastic ingredients that are widely used in cosmetics and personal care products.

Even when microbeads are removed from cosmetic products, there are still harmful products being sold with plastics in them. For example, acrylates copolymers cause toxic effects for waterways and animals if they are polluted. Acrylate copolymers also can emit styrene monomers when used in body products which increases a person's chances of cancer. Countries like New Zealand which have banned microbeads often pass over other polymers such as acrylates copolymer, which can be just as toxic to people and the environment.

Fishing industry
Recreational and commercial fishing, marine vessels, and marine industries are all sources of plastic that can directly enter the marine environment, posing a risk to biota both as macroplastics, and as secondary microplastics following long-term degradation. Marine debris observed on beaches also arises from beaching of materials carried on inshore and ocean currents. Fishing gear is a form of plastic debris with a marine source. Discarded or lost fishing gear, including plastic monofilament line and nylon netting (sometimes called ghost nets), is typically neutrally buoyant and can, therefore, drift at variable depths within the oceans. Various countries have reported that microplastics from the industry and other sources have been accumulating in different types of seafood. In Indonesia, 55% of all fish species had evidence of manufactured debris similar to America which reported 67%. However, the majority of debris in Indonesia was plastic, while in North America the majority was synthetic fibers found in clothing and some types of nets. The implication from the fact that fish are being contaminated with microplastic is that those plastics and their chemicals will bioaccumulate in the food chain.

One study analyzed the plastic-derived chemical called polybrominated diphenyl ethers (PBDEs) in the stomachs of short-tailed shearwaters. It found that one-fourth of the birds had higher-brominated congeners that are not naturally found in their prey. However, the PBDE got into the birds' systems through plastic that was found in the stomachs of the birds. It is therefore not just the plastics that are being transferred through the food chain but the chemicals from the plastics as well.

Manufacturing
The manufacture of plastic products uses granules and small resin pellets as their raw material. In the United States, production increased from 2.9 million pellets in 1960 to 21.7 million pellets in 1987. In 2019, plastic world production was 368 million tonnes; 51% were produced in Asia.  China, the world's largest producer, created 31% of the world total.  Through accidental spillage during land or sea transport, inappropriate use as packing materials, and direct outflow from processing plants, these raw materials can enter aquatic ecosystems. In an assessment of Swedish waters using an 80 µm mesh, KIMO Sweden found typical microplastic concentrations of 150–2,400 microplastics per m3; in a harbor adjacent to a plastic production facility, the concentration was 102,000 per m3.

Many industrial sites in which convenient raw plastics are frequently used are located near bodies of water. If spilled during production, these materials may enter the surrounding environment, polluting waterways. "More recently, Operation Cleansweep, a joint initiative of the American Chemistry Council and Society of the Plastics Industry, is aiming for industries to commit to zero pellet loss during their operations". Overall, there is a significant lack of research aimed at specific industries and companies that contribute to microplastics pollution.

Packaging and shipping
Shipping has significantly contributed to marine pollution. Some statistics indicate that in 1970, commercial shipping fleets around the world dumped over 23,000 tons of plastic waste into the marine environment. In 1988, an international agreement (MARPOL 73/78, Annex V) prohibited the dumping of waste from ships into the marine environment. In the United States, the Marine Plastic Pollution Research and Control Act of 1987 prohibits discharge of plastics in the sea, including from naval vessels. However, shipping remains a dominant source of plastic pollution, having contributed around 6.5 million tons of plastic in the early 1990s. Research has shown that approximately 10% of the plastic found on the beaches in Hawaii are nurdles. In one incident on July 24, 2012, 150 tonnes of nurdles and other raw plastic material spilled from a shipping vessel off the coast near Hong Kong after a major storm. This waste from the Chinese company Sinopec was reported to have piled up in large quantities on beaches. While this is a large incident of spillage, researchers speculate that smaller accidents also occur and further contribute to marine microplastic pollution.

Personal protective equipment

Face masks
Since the emergence of the COVID-19 pandemic, the usage of medical face masks has sharply increased to reach approximately 89 million masks each . Single use face masks are made from polymers, such as polypropylene, polyurethane, polyacrylonitrile, polystyrene, polycarbonate, polyethylene, or polyester. The increase in production, consumption, and littering of face masks was added to the list of environmental challenges, due to the addition of plastic particles waste in the environment. After degrading, disposable face masks could break down into smaller size particles (under 5mm) emerging a new source of microplastic.

A report made in February 2020 by Oceans Asia, an organization committed to advocacy and research on marine pollution, confirms "the presence of face masks of different types and colors in an ocean in Hong Kong".

Plastics

Bottled water
In one study, 93% of the bottled water from 11 different brands showed microplastic contamination. Per liter, researchers found an average of 325 microplastic particles. Of the tested brands, Nestlé Pure Life and Gerolsteiner bottles contained the most microplastic with 930 and 807 microplastic particles per liter (MPP/L), respectively. San Pellegrino products showed the least quantity of microplastic densities. Compared to water from taps, water from plastic bottles contained twice as much microplastic. Some of the contamination likely comes from the process of bottling and packaging the water.

Baby bottles

In 2020 researchers reported that polypropylene infant feeding bottles with contemporary preparation procedures were found to cause microplastics exposure to infants ranging from 14,600 to 4,550,000 particles per capita per day in 48 regions. Microplastics release is higher with warmer liquids and similar with other polypropylene products such as lunchboxes. Unexpectedly, silicone rubber baby bottle nipples degrade over time from repeated steam sterilization, shedding micro- and nano-sized particles of silicone rubber, researchers found in 2021. They estimated that, using such heat-degraded nipples for a year, a baby will ingest more than 660,000 particles.

Single-use plastic products

Common single-use plastic products – such as paper coffee cups that are lined with a thin plastic film inside – release trillions of microplastic-nanoparticles per liter into water during normal use. Single-use plastic products enter aquatic environments and "Local and statewide policies that reduce single-use plastics were identified as effective legislative actions that
communities can take to address plastic pollution".

Sewage treatment plants
Sewage treatment plants, also known as wastewater treatment plants (WWTPs), remove contaminants from wastewater, primarily from household sewage, using various physical, chemical, and biological processes. Most plants in developed countries have both primary and secondary treatment stages. In the primary stage of treatment, physical processes are employed to remove oils, sand, and other large solids using conventional filters, clarifiers, and settling tanks. Secondary treatment uses biological processes involving bacteria and protozoa to break down organic matter. Common secondary technologies are activated sludge systems, trickling filters, and constructed wetlands. The optional tertiary treatment stage may include processes for nutrient removal (nitrogen and phosphorus) and disinfection.

Microplastics have been detected in both the primary and secondary treatment stages of the plants. A groundbreaking 1998 study suggested that microplastic fibers would be a persistent indicator of sewage sludges and wastewater treatment plant outfalls. A study estimated that about one particle per liter of microplastics are being released back into the environment, with a removal efficiency of about 99.9%. A 2016 study showed that most microplastics are actually removed during the primary treatment stage where solid skimming and sludge settling are used. When these treatment facilities are functioning properly, the contribution of microplastics into oceans and surface water environments from WWTPs is not disproportionately large.

Sewage sludge is used for soil fertilizer in some countries, which exposes plastics in the sludge to the weather, sunlight, and other biological factors, causing fragmentation. As a result, microplastics from these biosolids often end up in storm drains and eventually into bodies of water. In addition, some studies show that microplastics do pass through filtration processes at some WWTPs. According to a study from the UK, samples taken from sewage sludge disposal sites on the coasts of six continents contained an average one particle of microplastic per liter. A significant amount of these particles was of clothing fibers from washing machine effluent.

Effects on the environment
According to a comprehensive review of scientific evidence published by the European Union's Scientific Advice Mechanism in 2019, microplastics are now present in every part of the environment. While there is no evidence of widespread ecological risk from microplastic pollution yet, risks are likely to become widespread within a century if pollution continues at its current rate.

Participants at the 2008 International Research Workshop on the Occurrence, Effects and Fate of Microplastic Marine Debris at the University of Washington at Tacoma concluded that microplastics are a problem in the marine environment, based on:
 the documented occurrence of microplastics in the marine environment,
 the long residence times of these particles (and, therefore, their likely buildup in the future), and
 their demonstrated ingestion by marine organisms.

So far, research has mainly focused on larger plastic items. Widely recognized problems facing marine life are entanglement, ingestion, suffocation and general debilitation often leading to death and/or strandings. This causes serious public concern. In contrast, microplastics are not as conspicuous, being less than 5 mm, and are usually invisible to the naked eye. Particles of this size are available to a much broader range of species, enter the food chain at the bottom, become embedded in animal tissue, and are then undetectable by unaided visual inspection.

Furthermore, consequences of plastic degradation and pollution release over long term have mostly been overlooked. The large amounts of plastic currently in the environment, exposed to degradation, but that has many more years of decay and release of toxic compounds to follow is referred to as toxicity debt.

Microplastics have been detected not just in marine but also in freshwater systems including marshes, streams, ponds, lakes, and rivers in (Europe, North America, South America, Asia and Australia). Samples collected across 29 Great Lakes tributaries from six states in the United States were found to contain plastic particles, 98% of which were microplastics ranging in size from 0.355mm to 4.75mm.

Biological integration into organisms
Microplastics can become embedded in animals' tissue through ingestion or respiration. Various annelid species, such as deposit-feeding lugworms (Arenicola marina), have been shown to have microplastics embedded in their gastrointestinal tracts. Many crustaceans, like the shore crab Carcinus maenas, have been seen to integrate microplastics into both their respiratory and digestive tracts. Plastic particles are often mistaken by fish for food which can block their digestive tracts sending incorrect feeding signals to the brains of the animals. New research revealed, however, that fish ingest microplastics inadvertently rather than intentionally.

Some coral such as Pocillopora verrucosa have also been found to ingest microplastics.
It can take up to 14 days for microplastics to pass through an animal (as compared to a normal digestion period of 2 days), but enmeshment of the particles in animals' gills can prevent elimination entirely. When microplastic-laden animals are consumed by predators, the microplastics are then incorporated into the bodies of higher trophic-level feeders. For example, scientists have reported plastic accumulation in the stomachs of lantern fish which are small filter feeders and are the main prey for commercial fish like tuna and swordfish. Microplastics also absorb chemical pollutants that can be transferred into the organism's tissues. Small animals are at risk of reduced food intake due to false satiation and resulting starvation or other physical harm from the microplastics.

A study done at the Argentinean coastline of the Rio de la Plata estuary, found the presence of microplastics in the guts of 11 species of coastal freshwater fish. These 11 species of fish represented four different feeding habits: detritivore, planktivore, omnivore and ichthyophagous. This study is one of the few so far to show the ingestion of microplastics by freshwater organisms.

Bottom feeders, such as benthic sea cucumbers, who are non-selective scavengers that feed on debris on the ocean floor, ingest large amounts of sediment. It has been shown that four species of sea cucumber (Thyonella gemmate, Holothuria floridana, H. grisea and Cucumaria frondosa) ingested between 2- and 20-fold more PVC fragments and between 2- and 138-fold more nylon line fragments (as much as 517 fibers per organism) based on plastic-to-sand grain ratios from each sediment treatment. These results suggest that individuals may be selectively ingesting plastic particles. This contradicts the accepted indiscriminate feeding strategy of sea cucumbers, and may occur in all presumed non-selective feeders when presented with microplastics.

Bivalves, important aquatic filter feeders, have also been shown to ingest microplastics and nanoplastics. Upon exposure to microplastics, bivalve filtration ability decreases. Multiple cascading effects occur as a result, such as immunotoxicity and neurotoxicity. Decreased immune function occurs due to reduced phagocytosis and NF-κB gene activity. Impaired neurological function is a result of the inhibition of ChE and suppression of neurotransmitter regulatory enzymes. When exposed to microplastics, bivalves also experience oxidative stress, indicating an impaired ability to detoxify compounds within the body, which can ultimately damage DNA. Bivalve gametes and larvae are also impaired when exposed to microplastics. Rates of developmental arrest, and developmental malformities increase, while rates of fertilization decrease. When bivalves have been exposed to microplastics as well as other pollutants such as POPs, mercury or hydrocarbons in lab settings, toxic effects were shown to be aggravated.

Not only fish and free-living organisms can ingest microplastics. Scleractinian corals, which are primary reef-builders, have been shown to ingest microplastics under laboratory conditions. While the effects of ingestion on these corals has not been studied, corals can easily become stressed and bleach. Microplastics have been shown to stick to the exterior of the corals after exposure in the laboratory. The adherence to the outside of corals can potentially be harmful, because corals cannot handle sediment or any particulate matter on their exterior and slough it off by secreting mucus, expending energy in the process, increasing the likelihood of mortality.

Marine biologists in 2017 discovered that three-quarters of the underwater seagrass in the Turneffe Atoll off the coast of Belize had microplastic fibers, shards, and beads stuck to it. The plastic pieces had been overgrown by epibionts (organisms that naturally stick themselves to seagrass). Seagrass is part of the barrier reef ecosystem and is fed on by parrotfish, which in turn are eaten by humans. These findings, published in Marine Pollution Bulletin, may be "the first discovery of microplastics on aquatic vascular plants... [and] only the second discovery of microplastics on marine plant life anywhere in the world."

It is not just aquatic animals which may be harmed. Microplastics can stunt the growth of terrestrial plants and earthworms.

In 2019, the first European records of microplastic items in amphibians' stomach content was reported in specimens of the common European newt (Triturus carnifex). This also represented the first evidence for Caudata worldwide, highlighting that the emerging issue of plastics is a threat even in remote high-altitude environments.

Zooplankton ingest microplastics beads (1.7–30.6 μm) and excrete fecal matter contaminated with microplastics. Along with ingestion, the microplastics stick to the appendages and exoskeleton of the zooplankton. Zooplankton, among other marine organisms, consume microplastics because they emit similar infochemicals, notably dimethyl sulfide, just as phytoplankton do. Plastics such as high-density polyethylene (HDPE), low-density polyethylene (LDPE), and polypropylene (PP) produce dimethyl sulfide odors. These types of plastics are commonly found in plastic bags, food storage containers, and bottle caps. Green and red filaments of plastics are found in the planktonic organisms and in seaweeds.

Not only do animals and plants ingest microplastics, some microbes also live on the surface of microplastics. This community of microbes form a slimy biofilm which, according to a 2019 study, has a unique structure and possesses a special risk, because microplastic biofilms have been proven to provide a novel habitat for colonization that increases overlap between different species, thus spreading pathogens and antibiotic resistant genes through horizontal gene transfer. Then, due to rapid movement through waterways, these pathogens can be moved very quickly from their origin to another location where a specific pathogen may not be naturally present, spreading the potential disease.

Humans
According to a comprehensive review of scientific evidence published by the European Union's Scientific Advice Mechanism in 2019, "little is known with respect to the human health risks of nano- and microplastics, and what is known is surrounded by considerable uncertainty". The authors of the review identify the main limitations as the quality or methodology of the research to date. Since "the poison is in the dose", the review concludes that "there is a need to understand the potential modes of toxicity for different size-shape-type NMP combinations in carefully selected human models, before robust conclusions about 'real' human risks can be made".

Mean/median intake of microplastics in humans are at levels considered to be safe in humans; however, some individuals may sometimes exceed these limits; the effects, if any, of this is unknown. It is unknown whether and to what degree microplastics bioaccumulate in humans. Research reported in 2022 identified, for the first time, the presence of polymers in human blood in 17 of 22 healthy volunteers. The mean of the sum quantifiable concentration of plastic particles was 1.6 mg/L. The stated purpose of the study was to develop a sampling and analytic method that could be used to detect plastics in human blood.

A recent sub-chronic study investigated methacrylate-based polymer beads (> 10 μm) in food for therapeutic purposes and it found no sign of polymer beads' bioaccumulation in mice organs apart from gastrointestinal tract. The microplastics ingested by fish and crustaceans can be subsequently consumed by humans as the end of the food chain. Microplastics are found in air, water, and food that humans eat, especially seafood; however, the degree of absorption and retention is unclear. However, ingestion of microplastics via food may be relatively minor; for example, while mussels are known to accumulate microplastics, humans are predicted to be exposed to more microplastics in household dust than by consuming mussels.

There are three main areas of potential concern with microplastics: the plastics themselves may have some effect on human physiology, microplastics might complex with heavy metals or other chemical compounds in the environment and act as a vector for bringing them into the body, and it is possible that microplastics might serve as vectors for pathogens. It is as yet unknown if exposure to microplastics at the levels found in the environment represent a "real" risk to humans; research into the subject is ongoing.

Persistent organic pollutants and Emerging organic contaminants
Plastic particles may highly concentrate and transport synthetic organic compounds (e.g. persistent organic pollutants and emerging organic contaminants), commonly present in the environment and ambient seawater, on their surface through adsorption. Microplastics can act as carriers for the transfer of POPs from the environment to organisms. Recent articles have also shown that microplastics can sorb emerging organic chemicals such as pharmaceuticals and personal care products.  The sorption potential is affected by water matrix, pH, ionic strength and aging of microparticles. 

Additives added to plastics during manufacture may leach out upon ingestion, potentially causing serious harm to the organism. Endocrine disruption by plastic additives may affect the reproductive health of humans and wildlife alike.

Plastics, polymers derived from mineral oils, are virtually non-biodegradable. However, renewable natural polymers are now in development which can be used for the production of biodegradable materials similar to those derived from oil-based polymers.

Disease 
In 2023, plasticosis, a new disease caused solely by plastics, was discovered in seabirds.
The birds identified as having the disease have scarred digestive tracts from ingesting plastic waste.  ”When birds ingest small pieces of plastic, they found, it inflames the digestive tract. Over time, the persistent inflammation causes tissues to become scarred and disfigured, affecting digestion, growth and survival.”

Where microplastics can be found

Steve Allen of Dalhousie University in Canada, main author of a study that found microplastics in high mountains, said "Plastic leaving the ocean into the air that high – it shows there is no eventual sink for this plastic. It's just moving around and around in an indefinite cycle."

Air 
Airborne microplastics have been detected in the atmosphere, as well as indoors and outdoors. In 2019 a study found microplastic to be atmospherically transported to remote areas on the wind. A 2017 study found indoor airborne microfiber concentrations between 1.0 and 60.0 microfibers per cubic meter (33% of which were found to be microplastics). Another study looked at microplastic in the street dust of Tehran and found 2,649 particles of microplastic within 10 samples of street dust, with ranging samples concentrations from 83 particle – 605 particles (±10) per 30.0 g of street dust. Microplastics and microfibers were also found in snow samples, and high up in "clean" air in high mountains at vast distances from their source. However, much like freshwater ecosystems and soil, more studies are needed to understand the full impact and significance of airborne microplastics.

Water

Oceans

Ice cores 
Kelly et al. found 96 microplastic particles from 14 different types of polymers in an ice core sampled in 2009 from east Antarctica. Plastic pollution has previously been recorded in Antarctic surface waters and sediments as well as in Arctic sea ice, but this is thought to be the first time plastic has been found in Antarctic sea ice. Relatively large particle sizes suggest local pollution sources.

Freshwater 
Microplastics have been widely detected in the world's aquatic environments. The first study on microplastics in freshwater ecosystems was published in 2011 that found an average of 37.8 fragments per square meter of Lake Huron sediment samples. Additionally, studies have found MP (microplastic) to be present in all of the Great Lakes with an average concentration of 43,000 MP particle km−2. Microplastics have also been detected in freshwater ecosystems outside of the United States. In Canada, a three-year study found a mean microplastic concentration of 193,420 particles km−2 in Lake Winnipeg. None of the microplastics detected were micro-pellets or beads and most were fibers resulting from the breakdown of larger particles, synthetic textiles, or atmospheric fallout. The highest concentration of microplastic ever discovered in a studied freshwater ecosystem was recorded in the Rhine river at 4000 MP particles kg−1.

Soil
A substantial portion of microplastics are expected to end up in the world's soil, yet very little research has been conducted on microplastics in soil outside of aquatic environments. In wetland environments microplastic concentrations have been found to exhibit a negative correlation with vegetation cover and stem density. There exists some speculation that fibrous secondary microplastics from washing machines could end up in soil through the failure of water treatment plants to completely filter out all of the microplastic fibers. Furthermore, geophagous soil fauna, such as earthworms, mites, and collembolans could contribute to the amount of secondary microplastic present in soil by converting consumed plastic debris into microplastic via digestive processes. Further research, however, is needed. There is concrete data linking the use of organic waste materials to synthetic fibers being found in the soil; but most studies on plastics in soil merely report its presence and do not mention origin or quantity. Controlled studies on fiber-containing land-applied wastewater sludges (biosolids) applied to soil reported semiquantitative recoveries of the fibers a number of years after application.

Human body
Microplastics find their way into the food we eat, the water we drink and even the air we breathe. By some estimates, people consume more than 50,000 plastic particles per year – and many more if inhalation is considered. Microplastics were found in every human tissue studied by graduate students at Arizona State University. A study published in March, 2022, revealed that Microplastics have also been found in 80% of 22 anonymous blood samples, meaning they can be transported around the human body and raising the question of whether they can be transported to the brain. In December 2020, microplastic particles were found in the placentas of unborn babies for the first time. In June 2022, microplastic particles were found in breastmilk for the first time.

According to a research conducted by the Medical University of Vienna, five grams of plastic particles enter each person's gastrointestinal stream on average per week. This is approximately the weight of a credit card. According to another recent estimate, a person who consumes seafood will ingest 11 000 bits of microplastics per year. Even very minute microplastics have been discovered in human blood. Microplastics have been discovered in food in recent investigations. A recent study found a kilo of sugar had 440 microplastics, a kilo of salt contained 110 microplastics, and a litre of bottled water contained 90 microplastics.

Prevention

Treatment 
Some researchers have proposed incinerating plastics to use as energy, which is known as energy recovery. As opposed to losing the energy from plastics into the atmosphere in landfills, this process turns some of the plastics back into energy that can be used. However, as opposed to recycling, this method does not diminish the amount of plastic material that is produced. Therefore, recycling plastics is considered a more efficient solution.

Biodegradation is another possible solution to large amounts of microplastic waste. In this process, microorganisms consume and decompose synthetic polymers by means of enzymes. These plastics can then be used in the form of energy and as a source of carbon once broken down. The microbes could potentially be used to treat sewage wastewater, which would decrease the amount of microplastics that pass through into the surrounding environments.

Filtering
Stormwater or wastewater collection systems can capture many microplastics which are transported to treatment plants, the captured microplastics become part of the sludge produced by the plants. This sludge is often used as farm fertilizer meaning the plastics enter waterways through runoff.

Fionn Ferreira, winner of the 2019 Google Science Fair, is developing a device for the removal of microplastic particles from water using a ferrofluid.

Collection devices 
Computer modelling done by The Ocean Cleanup, a Dutch foundation, has suggested that collection devices placed nearer to the coasts could remove about 31% of the microplastics in the area. On September 9, 2018, The Ocean Cleanup launched the world's first ocean cleanup system, 001 aka "Wilson", which is being deployed to the Great Pacific Garbage Patch. System 001 is 600 meters long that acts as a U-shaped skiff that uses natural oceanic currents to concentrate plastic and other debris on the ocean's surface into a confined area for extraction by vessels. The project has been met with criticism from oceanographers and plastic pollution experts, though it has seen wide public support.

In addition, some bacteria have adapted to eat plastic, and some bacteria species have been genetically modified to eat (certain types of) plastics.
Other than degrading microplastics, microbes had been engineered in a novel way to capture microplastics in their biofilm matrix from polluted samples for easier removal of such pollutants. The microplastics in the biofilms can then be released with an engineered 'release' mechanism via biofilm dispersal to facilitate with microplastics recovery.

Education and recycling 
Increasing education through recycling campaigns is another proposed solution for microplastic contamination. While this would be a smaller-scale solution, education has been shown to reduce littering, especially in urban environments where there are often large concentrations of plastic waste. If recycling efforts are increased, a cycle of plastic use and reuse would be created to decrease our waste output and production of new raw materials. In order to achieve this, states would need to employ stronger infrastructure and investment around recycling. Some advocate for improving recycling technology to be able to recycle smaller plastics to reduce the need for production of new plastics.

Action for creating awareness

On April 11, 2013, in order to create awareness, Italian artist Maria Cristina Finucci founded The Garbage Patch State under the patronage of UNESCO and the Italian Ministry of the Environment.

The U.S. Environmental Protection Agency (EPA) launched its "Trash-Free Waters" initiative in 2013 to prevent single-use plastic wastes from ending up in waterways and ultimately the ocean. EPA collaborates with the United Nations Environment Programme–Caribbean Environment Programme (UNEP-CEP) and the Peace Corps to reduce and also remove trash in the Caribbean Sea. EPA has also funded various projects in the San Francisco Bay Area including one that is aimed at reducing the use of single-use plastics such as disposable cups, spoons and straws, from three University of California campuses.

Additionally, there are many organizations advocating action to counter microplastics and that is spreading microplastic awareness. One such group is the Florida Microplastic Awareness Project (FMAP), a group of volunteers who search for microplastics in coastal water samples. There is also increased global advocacy aimed at achieving the target of the United Nations Sustainable Development Goal 14 which hopes to prevent and significantly reduce all forms of marine pollution by 2025.

Funding
The Clean Oceans Initiative is a project launched in 2018 by the public institutions European Investment Bank, Agence Française de Développement and KfW Entwicklungsbank. The goal of the organisations was to provide up to €2 billion in lending, grants and technical assistance until 2023 to develop projects that remove pollution from waterways (with a focus on macroplastics and microplastics) before it reaches the oceans. The effort focuses on initiatives that demonstrate efficient methods of minimising plastic waste and microplastics output, emphasising on riverine and coastal areas. Cassa Depositi e Prestiti (CDP), the Italian national promotional institution and financial institution for development cooperation, and the Instituto de Crédito Oficial (ICO), the Spanish promotional bank, became new partners in October 2020.

In February 2022, the initiative stated that it would increase its financing aim to €4 billion by the end of 2025. At the same time, the European Bank for Reconstruction and Development (EBRD) became the Clean Oceans Initiative's sixth member. By February 2023, the program had met 65% of its goal, with €2.6 billion spent in 60 projects benefiting more than 20 million people across Africa, Asia, Latin America, and Europe.

By the beginning of 2022, more than 80% of this target has been achieved, with €1.6 billion being used in long-term financing for public and private sector initiatives that minimise the discharge of plastics, microplastics, and other pollutants through enhanced solid waste, wastewater, and storm water management.

Policy and legislation
With increasing awareness of the detrimental effects of microplastics on the environment, groups are now advocating for the removal and ban of microplastics from various products. One such campaign is "Beat the Microbead", which focuses on removing plastics from personal care products. The Adventurers and Scientists for Conservation run the Global Microplastics Initiative, a project to collect water samples to provide scientists with better data about microplastic dispersion in the environment. UNESCO has sponsored research and global assessment programs due to the trans-boundary issue that microplastic pollution constitutes. These environmental groups will keep pressuring companies to remove plastics from their products in order to maintain healthy ecosystems.

China
China banned in 2018 the import of recyclables from other countries, forcing those other countries to re-examine their recycling schemes. The Yangtze River in China contributes 55% of all plastic waste going to the seas. Including microplastics, the Yangtze bears an average of 500,000 pieces of plastic per square kilometer. Scientific American reported that China dumps 30% of all plastics in the ocean.

United States
In the US, some states have taken action to mitigate the negative environmental effects of microplastics. Illinois was the first US state to ban cosmetics containing microplastics. On the national level, the Microbead-Free Waters Act 2015 was enacted after being signed by President Barack Obama on December 28, 2015. The law bans "rinse-off" cosmetic products that perform an exfoliating function, such as toothpaste or face wash. It does not apply to other products such as household cleaners. The act took effect on July 1, 2017, with respect to manufacturing, and July 1, 2018, with respect to introduction or delivery for introduction into interstate commerce. On June 16, 2020, California adopted a definition of 'microplastics in drinking water', setting the foundation for a long-term approach to studying their contamination and human health effects.

On July 25, 2018, a microplastic reduction amendment was passed by the U.S. House of Representatives. The legislation, as part of the Save Our Seas Act designed to combat marine pollution, aims to support the NOAA's Marine Debris Program. In particular, the amendment is geared towards promoting NOAA's Great Lakes Land-Based Marine Debris Action Plan to increase testing, cleanup, and education around plastic pollution in the Great Lakes. President Donald Trump signed the re-authorization and amendment bill into effect on October 11, 2018.

Japan
On June 15, 2018, the Japanese government passed a bill with the goal of reducing microplastic production and pollution, especially in aquatic environments. Proposed by the Environment Ministry and passed unanimously by the Upper House, this is also the first bill to pass in Japan that is specifically targeted at reducing microplastic production, specifically in the personal care industry with products such as face wash and toothpaste. This law is revised from previous legislation, which focused on removing plastic marine debris. It also focuses on increasing education and public awareness surrounding recycling and plastic waste. The Environment Ministry has also proposed a number of recommendations for methods to monitor microplastic quantities in the ocean (Recommendations, 2018). However, the legislation does not specify any penalties for those who continue manufacturing products with microplastics.

European Union
The European Commission has noted the increased concern about the impact of microplastics on the environment. In April 2018, the European Commission's Group of Chief Scientific Advisors commissioned a comprehensive review of the scientific evidence on microplastic pollution through the EU's Scientific Advice Mechanism. The evidence review was conducted by a working group nominated by European academies and delivered in January 2019. A Scientific Opinion based on the SAPEA report was presented to the Commission in 2019, on the basis of which the commission will consider whether policy changes should be proposed at a European level to curb microplastic pollution.

In January 2019, the European Chemicals Agency (ECHA) proposed to restrict intentionally added microplastics.

The European Commission's Circular Economy Action Plan sets out mandatory requirements for the recycling and waste reduction of key products e.g. plastic packaging. The plan starts the process to restrict addition of microplastics in products. It mandates measures for capturing more microplastics at all stages of the lifecycle of a product. E.g. the plan would examine different policies which aim to reduce release of secondary microplastics from tires and textiles. The European Commission plans to update the Urban Waste Water Treatment Directive to further address microplastic waste and other pollution. They aim to protect the environment from industrial and urban waste water discharge. A revision to the EU Drinking Water Directive was provisionally approved to ensure microplastics are regularly monitored in drinking water. It would require countries must propose solutions if a problem is found.

United Kingdom
The Environmental Protection (Microbeads) (England) Regulations 2017 ban the production of any rinse-off personal care products (such as exfoliants) containing microbeads. This particular law denotes specific penalties when it is not obeyed. Those who do not comply are required to pay a fine. In the event that a fine is not paid, product manufacturers may receive a stop notice, which prevents the manufacturer from continuing production until they have followed regulation preventing the use of microbeads. Criminal proceedings may occur if the stop notice is ignored.

See also
 Citizen Science, cleanup projects that people can take part in.
 Microbead (research)
 Microspheres
 Tea bag plastics

References

Sources

External links
 Evidence for microplastics in human lungs
 NOAA Marine Debris Program
 

Plastics and the environment
Environmental impact of products
Water pollution